Flamingo Road is an east–west section line arterial in the Las Vegas Valley. The road is named after Flamingo Las Vegas, which is located on Las Vegas Boulevard near where it intersects with Flamingo Road.
Two discontinuous segments of the road totaling  are designated State Route 592 (SR 592).

SR 592 route description

The first portion of SR 592 begins at Rainbow Boulevard (SR 595) and extends easterly to Interstate 15. The second section resumes at Paradise Road and continues east, skirting the northern edge of the University of Nevada, Las Vegas (UNLV) campus before reaching its terminus at Boulder Highway (SR 582).

History

Flamingo Road originally was called Monson Road, and only existed east of Las Vegas Boulevard, with a nearby street, Dunes Road connecting Las Vegas Boulevard with Interstate 15 (I-15). In the early 1980s, the Nevada Department of Transportation rebuilt the Dunes interchange at I-15, and constructed a six-lane Flamingo Road west to Rainbow Boulevard.

The segment between I-15 and Las Vegas Boulevard remained named Dunes-Flamingo Road until 1995.

The portion of SR 592 between I-15 and Paradise Road was decommissioned by 2008.

The route is a candidate to be decommissioned with control given to Clark County; however, only the above section located in the resort corridor has been relinquished as of January 2008.

Major intersections

Attractions
Palms Casino Resort
Gold Coast Hotel and Casino
Bellagio (resort)
Caesars Palace
Bally's Las Vegas
The Cromwell Las Vegas

Public transport
RTC Transit Route 202 functions on this road.

See also

References

Streets in the Las Vegas Valley